Lakshmi Villa is a village in Kanpur, U.P., India. It is located at 26 degree 24' 54" N  80 degree 24' 17" E.

References

Villages in Kanpur Nagar district